Herschel David "Herk" Baltimore (June 21, 1921 – January 1, 1968) was an American professional basketball player.

Baltimore played college basketball for the Penn State Nittany Lions. He served in World War II and received the Bronze Star Medal.

Baltimore played for the St. Louis Bombers of the Basketball Association of America (BAA) for 58 games during the 1946–47 season. He played for the Wilkes-Barre Barons of the American Basketball League (ABL) from 1947 to 1950.

Baltimore was inducted into the Lawrence County Historical Society Hall of Fame in 2002.

BAA career statistics

Regular season

Playoffs

References

External links

1921 births
1968 deaths
American men's basketball players
Basketball players from Pennsylvania
Forwards (basketball)
Penn State Nittany Lions basketball players
People from New Castle, Pennsylvania
St. Louis Bombers (NBA) players
United States Army personnel of World War II